Shayan Jahangir (born 24 December 1994) is a Pakistani-born American cricketer who currently plays for the United States cricket team.

He made his first-class debut for Pakistan International Airlines in the 2014–15 Quaid-e-Azam Trophy on 12 October 2014. In July 2020, he was named in the Barbados Tridents squad for the 2020 Caribbean Premier League (CPL). He made his Twenty20 debut on 5 September 2020, for the Barbados Tridents in the CPL.

In January 2021, USA Cricket named Jahangir in a 44-man squad to begin training in Texas ahead of the 2021 Oman Tri-Nation Series. In November 2022, Jahangir made his ODI debut for USA against Namibia

References

External links
 

1994 births
Living people
Pakistani cricketers
Cricketers from Karachi
Barbados Royals cricketers
Pakistan International Airlines cricketers
American cricketers
United States One Day International cricketers
Pakistani emigrants to the United States
American sportspeople of Pakistani descent